The Sakarya toothcarp (Aphanius villwocki) is a species of freshwater fish in the family Cyprinodontidae. It is endemic to the upper Sakarya River basin in Turkey. It is threatened by water abstraction, damming and a reduction of rainfall due to climate change. The specific name honours the German zoologist Wolfgang Villwock (1930-2014) of the University of Hamburg.

References

Aphanius
Endemic fauna of Turkey
Fish described in 2003